The Prix Iris for Best Visual Effects is an annual film award, presented by Québec Cinéma as part of its Prix Iris awards program, to honour the year's best visual effects in films made within the Cinema of Quebec.

The award was presented for the first time at the 19th Quebec Cinema Awards in 2017.

2010s

2020s

See also
Canadian Screen Award for Best Visual Effects

References

Awards established in 2017
Film awards for Best Visual Effects
Visual Effects
Quebec-related lists